The Regenerator Party (Portuguese: Partido Regenerador) was a Portuguese political party. Along with their "rivals" the Progressive Party, they dominated politics in the Kingdom of Portugal in the second half of the 19th century and early 20th century. The Regenerator, Progressist, and other political parties in the late Kingdom of Portugal were all run by friends of the king.

References

19th-century establishments in Portugal
Defunct political parties in Portugal
Political parties established in the 19th century
Conservative parties in Portugal